Manuel Fernández de Valderrama Tejedor (29 July 1904 - Unknown) was a Spanish footballer who played as a midfielder. He represented the three biggest Madrid teams of the 1920s and 30s, Real Madrid, Atlético Madrid and Racing de Madrid.

Club career
Born in Madrid, he began his career in 1923 with Real Madrid, and in his first season at the club, he helped them reach the 1924 Copa del Rey Final, which they lost 0–1 to Real Unión, courtesy of a goal from José Echeveste. He also helped the club to win the 1923–24 regional championship. At the end of the season, he moved to Racing de Madrid, for whom he played for 6 seasons until 1930, when he returned to Real, but once again, his spell there only lasted a single season (1930–31), because the club's board of directors decided that his poor performances did not allow him to continue defending Madrid's colors and so, he ended up without a club for the 1931–32 season before being rescued by Atlético Madrid for 1932–1933. He finished his career at AD Ferroviaria in 1936.

International career
Like most Real Madrid players of that time, he was summoned to play for the Madrid national team, and he was part of the team that reached the final of the 1923–24 Prince of Asturias Cup, an inter-regional competition organized by the RFEF, although he only played in the quarter-finals against Galicia, which his side won 1–0 thanks to an early goal from Antonio De Miguel.

Valderrama earned one international cap for both the Spanish A team and for the B side, both in 1927. His cap for the main side was held at El Sardinero on 17 April 1927, in a friendly against Switzerland which ended in a 1–0 win, courtesy of a goal from Óscar. On the other hand, his cap for the B side was held at the Metropolitano on 29 May 1927, in a friendly against the Portugal A side, and Valderrama scored in an 2-0 win.

Honours

Club
Real Madrid
Campeonato Regional Centro:
Champions (1): 1923–24

Copa del Rey:
Runner-up (1): 1924

International
Madrid XI
Prince of Asturias Cup:
Runner-up (1): 1923–24

References

1904 births
Real Madrid CF players
Atlético Madrid footballers
Association football forwards
Year of death missing
Spanish footballers
Spain international footballers